Union Square Drinking Fountain, also known as James Fountain, is an outdoor bronze sculpture and ornamental fountain by sculptor Adolf von Donndorf and architect J. Leonard Corning, located on the west side of Union Square Park in Manhattan, New York City. Cast in 1881 and dedicated on October 25, 1881, it was donated by Daniel Willis James "to promote public health as well as the virtue of charity". The statuary group includes a standing woman holding a baby in her right arm and a young child at her left side. They are set on an octagonal Swedish red granite pedestal with lion head fountains and basins on four of the sides.

References

External links
 Union Square Drinking Fountain, (sculpture)., Smithsonian Institution

1881 establishments in New York (state)
1881 sculptures
Bronze sculptures in Manhattan
Fountains in New York City
Granite sculptures in New York City
Outdoor sculptures in Manhattan
Sculptures of children in the United States
Sculptures of lions
Sculptures of women in New York City
Statues in New York City
Union Square, Manhattan